Winfield is an unincorporated community in Scott County, in the U.S. state of Arkansas.

History
Winfield was founded in 1882.  A post office called Winfield was established in 1882, and remained in operation until 1932.

References

Unincorporated communities in Arkansas
Unincorporated communities in Scott County, Arkansas